Thompson is a civil parish in the English county of Norfolk. For the purposes of local government, the parish falls within the district of Breckland.

Thompson is a relatively secluded village, located amongst acres of woodland, with the nearest town being Watton.

In this region the name Thompson is believed to have Danish origins, as it was part of the Danelaw after centuries of invasion. The village is recorded in the Domesday Book of 1086 as Tomesteda and Tomestuna.

References

External links

Villages in Norfolk
Civil parishes in Norfolk
Breckland District